John Clague may refer to:

 John Clague (physician) (1842–1908), Manx physician
 John Clague (artist) (1928–2004), American artist
 John J. Clague (born 1946), Canadian geologist